Ben Bishop Sr. is an American former professional tennis player.

Bishop is the son of an Air Force serviceman and as a result lived in several locations during his childhood, which included three years of high school in Wiesbaden, West Germany. 

A 1966 graduate of Duxbury High School in Massachusetts, Bishop played collegiate tennis for the University of Miami, then competed on the professional tour in the 1970s. His career included qualifying draw appearances at the French Open and Wimbledon Championships.

Bishop is the grandfather of NHL goaltender Ben Bishop III.

References

External links
 
 

Year of birth missing (living people)
Living people
American male tennis players
Miami Hurricanes men's tennis players